Operation Sandshaker was a three-year investigation, between 2000 and 2003 in Pensacola, Florida that resulted in the arrest of more than thirty residents, many of them respected individuals within the community. The individuals were suspected in trafficking cocaine from Miami into the Pensacola area. The cocaine ring was centered on a small bar, the Sandshaker, on the island town of Pensacola Beach.

The arrested included a millionaire, a middle school teacher, and a substance abuse counselor.

Location
The bar opened in 1977 and is credited with creating Pensacola's own drink, The Bushwacker.

Auction and reopening
The business operation was closed on September 16, 2004, due to Hurricane Ivan. The Sandwich Shop was not in operation prior to the hurricane. All accounts, contract rights, accounts receivables and general intangible rights relating to or otherwise existing as a consequence of the operation are included in the auction. The beverage license is a class 4 COP license. Bidding for the Sandshaker Lounge, Package Store and Sandwich Shop was conducted on online auction site Bid4Assets and bidding started at $295,000.

References

Criminal investigation
Pensacola metropolitan area
Crime in Florida